Tom Marquand (born 30 March 1998) is a British jockey who competes in flat racing.

Background 

Marquand spent his childhood near Cheltenham and, although not from a racing background, grew up around horses. After pony racing and riding out for local trainers, he joined the Wiltshire yard of trainer Richard Hannon as an apprentice at the age of 16.

Career 

Marquand rode his first winner in 2014 and was champion apprentice jockey in 2015. That year he reached the finals of the BBC Young Sports Personality of the Year.  On 7 September 2017 he rode his first Group race winner (40/1 outsider Anna Nerium in the Group 3 Dick Poole Fillies' Stakes at Salisbury). In 2018 he rode more than 100 winners, including Anna Nerium in another Group 3 race, the Supreme Stakes at Goodwood. Over Christmas and the New Year he spent six weeks in Australia riding for the Sydney trainer John O'Shea. There were two more Group 3 victories in 2019: the Princess Elizabeth Stakes at Epsom Downs on Anna Nerium and the Prix Belle de Nuit at Saint-Cloud, France, on Monica Sheriff. Another trip to Australia in March–April 2020 provided Marquand with a Group 1 double on the William Haggas-trained Addeybb in the Ranvet Stakes and the Queen Elizabeth Stakes. Marquand also had several successes in Group 3 races in Australia and was nicknamed 'Aussie Tom' by Australian racing fans.

On 4 July 2020, Marquand had his first ride in the Epsom Derby. He had ridden English King to win the Lingfield Derby Trial but lost the Derby ride on the fancied runner to Frankie Dettori. Instead he secured a ride on 50/1 outsider Khalifa Sat and finished in second place behind Serpentine.

Marquand's first Classic win came on Galileo Chrome in the St Leger Stakes at Doncaster on 12 September 2020. He had only been given the ride the previous day, when jockey Shane Crosse tested positive for Covid-19.

Personal life 

Marquand is married to jockey Hollie Doyle. The couple met in their pony racing days, and they were for a time apprentices together at Richard Hannon's yard. They became engaged in 2020 and married on 21 March 2022 in the parish church of the village of Ivington in Herefordshire.

Major wins

 Great Britain
 Champion Stakes - (1) - Addeybb (2020)
 St Leger Stakes - (1) - Galileo Chrome (2020)
 Queen Elizabeth II Stakes - (1) - Bayside Boy (2022)
 July Cup - (1) - Starman (2021)

 Ireland
 Tattersalls Gold Cup - (1) -  Alenquer (2022)

 Australia
 Ranvet Stakes - (1) - Addeybb (2020)
 Queen Elizabeth Stakes (ATC) - (2) - Addeybb (2020, 2021)

 France
 Prix de Royallieu - (1) - Sea La Rosa (2022) ''

References 

1998 births
Living people
British jockeys
British Champion apprentice jockeys